Teymourian is a surname. Notable people with the surname include:

 Andranik Teymourian (born 1983), Iranian footballer, brother of Serjik
 Roya Teymourian (born 1959), Iranian actress
 Serjik Teymourian (1974–2020), Armenian-Iranian footballer